Folkoperan is an opera house in Stockholm, Sweden, at Hornsgatan 72 in the southern district of Södermalm. It is one of Stockholm's most successful opera houses in terms of audience attendance, and is considered Sweden's most important stage for freelance opera singers and musicians.

History
Folkoperan was founded in 1976 by Claes Fellbom, Kerstin Nerbe, and Krister Fagerströmin.  The opera house is located in a building which was designed by architect Höög & Morssing in elegant 1920s Nordic Classicism. It was first erected by the cinema owner and builder John A. Bergendahl (1872–1958)  at the site of the former Maria saluhall. At that time it was one of Stockholm's largest cinemas with 1,002 seats.

As a theatre institute,  Folkoperan receives annual funding from the Swedish Arts Council, the Stockholm County Council, and the City of Stockholm.
Over the years, Folkoperan has functioned as an antithesis to the Royal Swedish Opera in Stockholm. It has become much appreciated by the Swedish opera audience due to its smaller more intimate stage and unconventional productions.  
Folkoperan celebrated its 25th anniversary with the new opera, Jeppe: The Cruel Comedy, written and directed by Claes Fellbom and composed by Sven-David Sandström (1942–2019).

References

Other sources
Fellbom, Claes (2012)  Född ur passion: Folkoperan, som jag såg den (Stockholm: Carlsson) 
Berglund, Kurt (1993) Stockholms alla biografer: ett stycke Stockholmshistoria från 90-tal till 90-tal (Stockholm: Svenska turistföreningen)

External links
 Folkoperan (official site)

Opera houses in Sweden
Swedish opera companies
Buildings and structures in Stockholm
Music in Stockholm
1976 establishments in Sweden
Tourist attractions in Stockholm
Theatres completed in 1976
Music venues completed in 1976